is a railway station in Minato, Tokyo, Japan. The station's official name was announced on 5 December 2018, before it opened on 6 June 2020. The station is operated by Tokyo Metro. The station number is H-06.

Lines 

Station layout

History 
Toranomon Hills Station was planned to be provisionally opened in time for the 2020 Summer Olympics, and will be fully opened by fiscal 2022.

By its opening on 6 June 2020, Toranomon Hills Station will implement its station number, H-06. As a result, the station numbers for stations after Toranomon Hills (Kasumigaseki to Kita-Senju) will have to be adjusted.

Toranomon Hills is only Hibiya Line station built under the ownership of Tokyo Metro after the privatization of the Teito Rapid Transit Authority (TRTA) in 2004.

Surrounding areas 
The station is built directly under the Japan National Route 1 (Sakurada-dori section). It is west of the Toranomon Hills Mori Tower. At the two sides adjacent to the station will be two underground station plazas, which were built during the redevelopment for the Toranomon Hills.

The station is located on the west side of the Toranomon Hills commercial and residential complex which opened in June 2014, and will provide connections with a new bus and Tokyo BRT terminal also planned ahead of the 2020 Olympics.

See also 

 List of railway stations in Japan
 Toranomon Station, a connecting station nearby on the Ginza Line.

References

External links 

 Tokyo Metro station information 
 Tokyo Metro station information 

Railway stations in Japan opened in 2020
Railway stations in Tokyo
Tokyo Metro Hibiya Line
Stations of Tokyo Metro